The Indian state of Uttar Pradesh borders with Nepal and the Indian states of Bihar, Jharkhand, Chhattisgarh, Madhya Pradesh, Rajasthan, Haryana, Uttarakhand, Himachal Pradesh and National Capital Territory of Delhi. The Himalayas lies in the north of the state and the Deccan Plateau is at the south. In between them, the river Ganges, Yamuna and Sarayu flow eastwards. Uttar Pradesh can be divided into two distinct regions, Southern hills and Gangetic plain. Uttar Pradesh is divided into 75 districts under 18 divisions. As of 2011, with an estimated population of 199,581,477. Uttar Pradesh is the most populous state in India. Uttar Pradesh occupies 6.88 percent of the India's land surface area but is home to 16.49 percent of the India's population. As of 2011, 64 cities in the state had a population of over 100,000 people. Kanpur is the largest city of Uttar Pradesh in terms of population whereas Lucknow is the largest city of Uttar Pradesh covering an area of 631Km Square which is the most among all cities in UP as per their Municipal Limits. The smallest city with a population over 100,000 people was Kasganj with a population of 101,241 people according to 2011 census figures.

List

This list refers only to the population of individual municipalities within their defined limits; the populations of other municipalities considered suburbs or outgrowths of a central city are listed separately, and unincorporated areas within urban agglomerations are not included. Therefore, a different ranking is evident when considering metropolitan area population of india

As per census data 2011, the total population of Uttar Pradesh is: 199,581,477.

See also
Divisions of Uttar Pradesh
Districts of Uttar Pradesh
List of urban agglomerations in Uttar Pradesh
List of metropolitan areas in India
List of states and union territories of India by population

References

 
Cities
Uttar Praesh